Karola Fings (born 1962 in Leverkusen) is a German historian.

Works
Messelager Köln. Ein KZ-Außenlager im Zentrum der Stadt, Köln 1996.

References

1962 births
Living people
People from Leverkusen
German women historians
20th-century German historians
21st-century German historians